Quercus skinneri is a species of oak. It is found in Mexico, Guatemala, Honduras, and El Salvador. It is threatened by habitat loss.

Description
Quercus skinneri is a medium-sized to large tree, growing up to 25 meters tall.

Range and habitat
Quercus skinneri is found in the mountains and foothills of southern Mexico, including the coastal Sierra de los Tuxtlas of Veracruz and the Chiapas Highlands and Sierra Madre de Chiapas of Chiapas, and scattered sites in the eastern Sierra Madre del Sur and southern Sierra Madre Oriental. It is also found in the Sierra Madre de Chiapas and Guatemalan Highlands of Guatemala, the Maya Mountains of Belize, and the Chortis Highlands of El Salvador and Honduras. The species' estimated area of occupancy (AOO) is 580 km2, which may be an under-estimate due to under-sampling.

The species' habitat includes old-growth cloud forests and other types of montane humid forest, from 1,000 to 2,400 meters elevation. It can be locally abundant in suitable habitats, but is often scarce across its range.

Conservation and threats
The species is threatened with habitat loss from deforestation of cloud forests in Mexico and Central America. Threats to the species and its habitat include livestock grazing, firewood collection, timber harvesting, shifting cultivation, and conversion forest to agriculture or livestock pasture. Its subpopulations are fragmented, and the number of mature individuals is declining. The species is assessed as near threatened.

References

skinneri
Cloud forest flora of Mexico
Flora of the Central American montane forests
Flora of Los Tuxtlas
Sierra Madre de Chiapas
Flora of the Chiapas Highlands
Oaks of Mexico
Trees of Guatemala
Trees of Honduras
Trees of El Salvador
Trees of Belize
Taxonomy articles created by Polbot

nah:Teōcuahuitl